Red everlasting may refer to:

 Helichrysum sanguineum
 
 Phaenocoma prolifera